Nurhayati (born 12 January 2002) is an Indonesian footballer who plays a midfielder for PSS Putri and the Indonesia women's national team.

Club career
Nurhayati has played for PSS Putri in Indonesia.

International career 
Nurhayati represented Indonesia at the 2022 AFC Women's Asian Cup qualification.

References

External links

2002 births
Living people
People from Asahan Regency
Sportspeople from North Sumatra
Indonesian women's footballers
Women's association football midfielders
Indonesia women's international footballers
Indonesian Muslims
21st-century Indonesian women